Leofdag of Ribe was the first Bishop of Ribe in Denmark, later regarded as a local saint but never canonized. Ribe was established as a diocese for Leofdag in 948 under the supervision of the Archbishop of Hamburg, who was authorized by the Roman Curia to proselytize the Danes.

Biography
Leofdag was consecrated by Archbishop Adaldag of Hamburg, probably at the Synod of Ingelheim (Germany), which the Jutlandic bishops attended. Leofdag was martyred that same year, when a housecarl skewered him with a spear, as he forded the river at Ribe.

Although never canonized, Leofdag is revered as a local saint and martyr. His remains would eventually end up in Ribe Cathedral. Until the death of his third known successor Vale (1044–59) the bishops of Ribe, Schleswig, and Aarhus wandered about Jutland on missionary tours.

See also

References

External links
http://www.newadvent.org/cathen/16070b.htm

Danish Roman Catholic saints
Year of birth unknown
Year of death unknown
Medieval Danish saints
10th-century bishops in Denmark